Science National Honor Society is an academic nationwide honor society focused on science for high school students in the United States. The society was established in 2000 in Texas and has expanded to over 1733 schools in all 50 states. The Science National Honor Society, similar to the Spanish National Honor Society and National Art Honor Society, is different from the National Honor Society. It focuses on the sciences and works to promote it entirely on the high school level.

External links 
 Official site

High school honor societies
Organizations established in 2000
Educational organizations based in the United States